New Post 69 is a First Nations reserve near Fraserdale in Cochrane District, Ontario. It is one of the reserves of the Taykwa Tagamou Nation.

References

External links
 Canada Lands Survey System

Cree reserves in Ontario
Communities in Cochrane District